United States customary units form a system of measurement units commonly used in the United States and most U.S. territories. since being standardized and adopted in 1832. The United States customary system (USCS or USC) developed from English units which were in use in the British Empire before the U.S. became an independent country. The United Kingdom's system of measures was overhauled in 1824 to create the imperial system, which was officially adopted in 1826, changing the definitions of some of its units. Consequently, while many U.S. units are essentially similar to their imperial counterparts, there are significant differences between the systems.

The majority of U.S. customary units were redefined in terms of the meter and kilogram with the Mendenhall Order of 1893 and, in practice, for many years before. These definitions were refined by the international yard and pound agreement of 1959.

Americans use customary units in commercial activities, as well as for personal and social use. In science, medicine, many sectors of industry, and some government and military areas, metric units are used. The International System of Units (SI), the modern form of the metric system, is preferred for many uses by the U.S. National Institute of Standards and Technology (NIST). For newer units of measure where there is no traditional customary unit, international units are used, sometimes mixed with customary units; for example, electrical resistance of wire expressed in ohms (SI) per thousand feet.

History

The United States system of units of 1832 is based on the system in use in Britain prior to the introduction to the British imperial system on January 1, 1826. Both systems are derived from English units, a system which had evolved over the millennia before American independence, and which had its roots in both Roman and Anglo-Saxon units.

The customary system was championed by the U.S.-based International Institute for Preserving and Perfecting Weights and Measures in the late 19th century. Some advocates of the customary system saw the French Revolutionary, or metric, system as atheistic. The president of an Ohio auxiliary of the Institute wrote that the traditional units were "a just weight and a just measure, which alone are acceptable to the Lord". His organization later went so far as to publish music for a song proclaiming "down with every 'metric' scheme".

The U.S. government passed the Metric Conversion Act of 1975, which made the metric system "the preferred system of weights and measures for U.S. trade and commerce". The legislation states that the federal government has a responsibility to assist industry as it voluntarily converts to the metric system, i.e., metrification. This is most evident in U.S. labeling requirements on food products, where SI units are almost always presented alongside customary units. According to the CIA World Factbook, the United States is one of three nations (along with Liberia and Myanmar) that have not adopted the metric system as their official system of weights and measures.

Executive Order 12770, signed by President George H. W. Bush on July 25, 1991, citing the Metric Conversion Act, directed departments and agencies within the executive branch of the United States Government to "take all appropriate measures within their authority" to use the metric system "as the preferred system of weights and measures for United States trade and commerce" and authorized the Secretary of Commerce "to charter an Interagency Council on Metric Policy ('ICMP'), which will assist the Secretary in coordinating Federal Government-wide implementation of this order."

U.S. customary units are widely used on consumer products and in industrial manufacturing. Metric units are standard in science, medicine, as well as many sectors of industry and government, including the military. There are anecdotal objections to the use of metric units in carpentry and the building trades, on the basis that it is easier to remember an integer number of inches plus a fraction than a measurement in millimeters, or that foot-inch measurements are more suitable when distances are frequently divided into halves, thirds and quarters, often in parallel. The metric system also lacks a parallel measure to the foot.

Length

For measuring length, the U.S. customary system uses the inch, foot, yard, and mile, which are the only four customary length measurements in everyday use. From 1893, the foot was legally defined as exactly 1200/3937 m (≈0.3048006 m). Since July 1, 1959, the units of length have been defined on the basis of 1 yard = 0.9144 meters except for some applications in surveying. The U.S., the United Kingdom and other Commonwealth countries agreed on this definition per the International Yard and Pound Agreement of 1958. At the time of the agreement, the basic geodetic datum in North America was the North American Datum of 1927 (NAD27), which had been constructed by triangulation based on the definition of the foot in the Mendenhall Order of 1893, that is 1 foot =  m: this definition was retained for data derived from NAD27, but renamed the US survey foot to distinguish it from the international foot. For most applications, the difference between the two definitions is insignificant – one international foot is exactly 0.999998 of a US survey foot, for a difference of about  inch (3 mm) per mile – but it affects the definition of the State Plane Coordinate Systems (SPCSs), which can stretch over hundreds of miles.

The NAD27 was replaced in the 1980s by the North American Datum of 1983 (NAD83), which is defined in meters. The SPCSs were also updated, but the U.S. National Geodetic Survey left the decision of which (if any) definition of the foot to use to the individual states. All SPCSs are defined in meters, but seven states also have SPCSs defined in US survey feet and the eighth state in international feet: the other 42 states use exclusively metric SPCSs.

State legislation also determines the conversion factor to be used for everyday land surveying and real estate transactions, although the difference (2 ppm) is of no practical significance given the precision of normal surveying measurements over short distances (usually much less than a mile). Twenty-four states have legislated that surveying measures should be based on the US survey foot, eight have legislated that they be made on the basis of the international foot, and eighteen have not specified the conversion factor from metric units.

In 2019, the NIST, working with the National Geodetic Survey (NGS), National Ocean Service (NOS), National Oceanic and Atmospheric Administration (NOAA) and  Department of Commerce (DOC), issued a Federal Register Notice (FRN) indicating the deprecation of the U.S. survey foot and U.S. survey mile units from 31 December 2022.

Area

The most widely used area unit with a name unrelated to any length unit is the acre. The National Institute of Standards and Technology contends that customary area units are defined in terms of the square survey foot, not the square international foot. Conversion factors are based on Astin (July 27, 1968) and National Institute of Standards and Technology (2008).

Volume

The cubic inch, cubic foot and cubic yard are commonly used for measuring volume. In addition, there is one group of units for measuring volumes of liquids (based on the wine gallon and subdivisions of the fluid ounce), and one for measuring volumes of dry material, each with their own names and sub-units.

Although the units and their names are similar to the units in the imperial system, and many units are shared between the two systems as a whole; with respect to volume, however, this is quite the contrary. The independence of the U.S. from the British Empire decades prior to the reformation of units in 1824 — most notably the gallon, its subdivisions, and (in mass) higher combinations above the pound — is the cause of the differences in values. As a non-participant in that reform, the U.S. retained the separate systems for measuring the volumes of liquids and dry material, whereas the imperial system had unified the units for both under a new imperial gallon.

Fluid volume

Consequently, a fluid ounce of water weighs about 1.041 ounces avoirdupois.

The saying, "a pint's a pound the world around," refers to 16 US fluid ounces of water weighing approximately (about 4% more than) one pound avoirdupois. An imperial pint of water weighs a pound and a quarter (20 oz).

There are varying standards for barrel for some specific commodities, including 31 gallons for beer, 40 gallons for whiskey or kerosene, and 42 gallons for petroleum.  The general standard for liquids is 31.5 gal or half a hogshead.  The common 55-gallon size of drum for storing and transporting various products and wastes is sometimes confused with a barrel, though it is not a standard measure.

In the U.S., single servings of beverages are usually measured in fluid ounces. Milk is usually sold in half-pints (8 fluid ounces), pints, quarts, half gallons, and gallons. Water volume for sinks, bathtubs, ponds, swimming pools, etc., is usually stated in gallons or cubic feet.  Quantities of gases are usually given in cubic feet (at one atmosphere).

Minims, drams, gill, and pottle are rarely used currently. The gill is often referred to as a "half-cup". The pottle is often referred to as a "half-gallon".

Dry volume

Dry volume is measured on a separate system, although many of the names remain the same. Small fruits and vegetables are often sold in dry pints and dry quarts. The US dry gallon is less commonly used, and was not included in the handbook that many states recognize as the authority on measurement law. However pecks, or bushels are sometimes used—particularly for grapes, apples and similar fruits in agricultural regions.

Mass and weight

There have historically been five different English systems of mass: tower, apothecaries', troy, avoirdupois, and metric. Of these, the avoirdupois weight is the most common system used in the U.S., although Troy weight is still used to weigh precious metals. Apothecaries weight—once used by pharmacies—has been largely replaced by metric measurements. Tower weight fell out of use in England (due to legal prohibition in 1527) centuries ago, and was never used in the U.S. The imperial system, which is still used for some measures in the United Kingdom and other countries, is based on avoirdupois, with variations from U.S. customary units larger than a pound.

The pound avoirdupois, which forms the basis of the U.S. customary system of mass, is defined as exactly  by agreement between the U.S., the United Kingdom, and other English-speaking countries in 1959. Other units of mass are defined in terms of it.

The avoirdupois pound is legally defined as a measure of mass, but the name pound is also applied to measures of force. For instance, in many contexts, the pound avoirdupois is used as a unit of mass, but in some contexts, the term "pound" is used to refer to "pound-force". The slug is another unit of mass derived from pound-force.

Troy weight, avoirdupois weight, and apothecaries' weight are all built from the same basic unit, the grain, which is the same in all three systems. However, while each system has some overlap in the names of their units of measure (all have ounces and pounds), the relationship between the grain and these other units within each system varies. For example, in apothecary and troy weight, the pound and ounce are the same, but are different from the pound and ounce in avoirdupois in terms of their relationships to grains and to each other. The systems also have different units between the grain and ounce (apothecaries' has scruple and dram, troy has pennyweight, and avoirdupois has just dram, sometimes spelled drachm).  The dram in avoirdupois weighs just under half of the dram in apothecaries'. The fluid dram unit of volume is based on the weight of 1 dram of water in the apothecaries' system.

To alleviate confusion, it is typical when publishing non-avoirdupois weights to mention the name of the system along with the unit. Precious metals, for example, are often weighed in "troy ounces", because just "ounce" would be more likely to be assumed to mean an avoirdupois ounce.

For the pound and smaller units, the U.S. customary system and the British imperial system are identical. However, they differ when dealing with units larger than the pound. The definition of the pound avoirdupois in the imperial system is identical to that in the U.S. customary system.

In the U.S., only the ounce, pound and short ton – known in the country simply as the ton – are commonly used, though the hundredweight is still used in agriculture and shipping. The grain is used to describe the mass of propellant and projectiles in small arms ammunition. It was also used to measure medicine and other very small masses.

Grain measures
The mass of grain will therefore vary according to density. Some nominal weight examples are;
 1 bushel (corn) = 56 lb = 25.4012 kg
 1 bushel (wheat) = 60 lb = 27.2155 kg
 1 bushel (barley) = 48 lb = 21.7724 kg

Cooking measures

The most common practical cooking measures for both liquid and dry ingredients in the U.S. are the teaspoon, tablespoon, and cup, along with halves, thirds, quarters, and eighths of them.  Pounds, ounces, fluid ounces, and common sizes are also used, such as can (presumed size varies depending on product), jar, square (e.g., 1 oz of chocolate), stick (e.g., 4 oz butter), or fruit/vegetable (e.g., a half lemon, two medium onions).

Temperature
Degrees Fahrenheit are used in the U.S. to measure temperatures in most non-scientific contexts. The Rankine scale of absolute temperature also saw some use in thermodynamics. Scientists worldwide use the kelvin and degree Celsius. Several U.S. technical standards are expressed in Fahrenheit temperatures, and some American medical practitioners use degrees Fahrenheit for body temperature.

The relationship between the different temperature scales is linear but the scales have different zero points, so conversion is not simply multiplication by a factor. Pure water freezes at 32 °F = 0 °C and boils at 212 °F = 100 °C at 1 atm.  The conversion formula is:

or inversely as

Other units
Length
 1 hand = 4 in = 
 1 U (rack unit) = 1.75 in = 
Volume
 1 board-foot = 1 ft × 1 ft × 1 in = 
Mass
 1 slug = 1 lbf⋅s2/ft ≈ 14.59390 kg 
Force
 1 poundal = force to accelerate 1 pound mass 1 foot/second/second ≈ 0.138 Newtons.
 1 kip = 1000 lbf ≈ 
Energy
 1 foot-pound ≈ 
 1 British thermal unit (Btu) ≈ 
Power
 1 horsepower ≈ 
 1 ton of refrigeration (12,000 Btu/h) = 
Pressure
 1 inch of mercury = the pressure produced by 25.4 mm depth of mercury = 3,386.85 pascals (33.8685 hPa, millibars)
 1 pound per square inch (psi) ≈ 
Torque
 1 pound-foot ≈ 
Insulation
 1 R-value (ft2⋅°F⋅h/Btu) ≈ 0.1761 RSI (K⋅m2/W)

Various combination units are in common use; these are straightforwardly defined based on the above basic units.

Sizing systems are used for various items in commerce, several of which are U.S.-specific:
 US standard clothing size
 American wire gauge is used for most metal wire.
 Scoop (utensil) sizes, numbered by scoops per quart
 Thickness of leather is measured in ounces, 1 oz equals .
 Bolts and screws follow the Unified Thread Standard rather than the ISO metric screw thread standard.
 Knitting needles in the United States are measured according to a non-linear unitless numerical system.
 Aluminum foil is measured in mils ( inch, or 0.0254 mm) in the United States.
Since this is so small, actual wire is commonly measured in thousands of a cmil, called either kcmil or MCM.
 The mil or thou is also sometimes used to mean thousandth of an inch.
 Sheet metal in the U.S. is commonly measured in gauge (not to be confused with the American wire gauge), which is derived from weight and thus differs by material.
 Nominal Pipe Size is used for the outside diameter of pipes. Below NPS14, the NPS number is not consistent with the pipe diameter in inches.
 Copper tubing, however, is measured in nominal size,  inch less than the outside diameter.
 The Schedule system is used for standard pipe thicknesses.
 Alcohol content is frequently given in proof, 2 × alcohol by volume
 The cord is used for volume of firewood.
 The square is used to mean 100 square feet in construction.
 Heat flux in the U.S. is measured in langleys.

Other names for U.S. customary units
The United States Code refers to these units as "traditional systems of weights and measures".

Other common ways of referring to the system are: customary, standard, English, or imperial (which refers to the post-1824 reform measures used throughout the British Empire & Commonwealth countries). Another term is the foot–pound–second (FPS) system, as opposed to centimeter–gram–second (CGS) and meter–kilogram–second (MKS) systems.

Tools and fasteners with sizes measured in inches are sometimes called "SAE bolts" or "SAE wrenches" to differentiate them from their metric counterparts.  The Society of Automotive Engineers (SAE) originally developed fasteners standards using U.S. units for the U.S. auto industry; the organization now uses metric units.

See also
 Board foot
 Conversion of units
 History of measurement and units of measurement
 Plan for Establishing Uniformity in the Coinage, Weights, and Measures of the United States (1790)
 Mars Climate Orbiter, which failed due to a measurement-units-related software bug
 Standard cubic foot

References

External links
 Rowlett's Dictionary of Units of Measurement (archived)

 
Imperial units
Systems of units